At the 2007 Military World Games, the track and field events were held at the G. M. C. Balayogi Athletic Stadium in Hyderabad, India from 15 – 18 October 2007. A total of 36 events were contested, of which 22 by male and 14 by female athletes. Kenya topped the medal table with five gold medals and a total of 12 – the track and field competition accounted for all of the African nation's medals at the games, which brought them sixth place on the overall games medal count. Russia took second with four golds and eight silvers, having the joint greatest medal total. Poland, the People's Republic of China, and Saudi Arabia also achieved four gold medals. Athletes from thirty three of the participating countries reached the podium at the four-day competition organised by the Conseil International du Sport Militaire, which had no obvious dominant nation.

The competition featured a number of athletes who had been successful at the 2007 World Championships in Athletics: Hrysopiyi Devetzi—the world triple jump bronze medallist—won her event, as did hammer throwers Zhang Wenxiu and Primož Kozmus. Some World Championships medallists found themselves in the silver medal spot on the military stage, including Daniela Yordanova (1500 m), Anna Chicherova (high jump), and Shadrack Korir (1500 m).

Samuel Francis set a new Games record in the 100 metres, but his attempt to double his medals in the 200 metres was thwarted by a false start elimination. John Cheruiyot Korir retained his title in the 10,000 metres in a Games record time. The men's high jump competition was unusual in that all the medalists achieved the same height (2.26 m) which made them all Games record holders, although the medals were decided on count-back. A total of seven Games records were broken or equalled at the 2007 edition of the Games.

Records

Medal summary

Men

† Ran in heats only

Women

Medal table

References

Day reports
 Krishnan, Ram. Murali (2007-10-16). Osaka medallists star - Wenxiu’s 72m defies Khanafeyeva - World Military Games, Day 1. IAAF. Retrieved on 2010-07-19.
 Krishnan, Ram. Murali (2007-10-17). Asian champ Francis wins 100m in 10.10sec - World Military Games, Day 2. IAAF. Retrieved on 2010-07-19.
 Krishnan, Ram. Murali (2007-10-18). World 1500m bronze medallist Korir takes unexpected defeat – World Military Games, Day 3. IAAF. Retrieved on 2010-07-19.
 Krishnan, Ram. Murali (2007-10-19). Vita Palamar dethrones Anna Chicherova – World Military Games, final day. IAAF. Retrieved on 2010-07-19.
Results
 IV Military World Games. CISM. Archived from the original on 2014-11-30. Retrieved on 2014-11-21.

External links

 Archived version of official website

2007 Military World Games
Military World Games
2007
2007 Military World Games